The 2015–16 Montana Lady Griz basketball team represents the University of Montana during the 2015–16 NCAA Division I women's basketball season. The Lady Griz, led by thirty-eighth year head coach Robin Selvig, play their home games at Dahlberg Arena and were members of the Big Sky Conference. They finished the season 20–11, 12–6 in Big Sky play to finish in fifth place. They advanced to the quarterfinals of the Big Sky women's tournament where they lost to North Dakota. Despite having 20 wins, they were not invited to a postseason tournament.

Roster

Schedule
Source 

|-
!colspan=9 style="background:#660033; color:#999999;"| Exhibition

|-
!colspan=9 style="background:#660033; color:#999999;"| Non-conference regular season

|-
!colspan=9 style="background:#660033; color:#999999;"| Big Sky regular season

|-
!colspan=9 style="background:#660033; color:#848482;"| Big Sky Women's Tournament

See also
 2015–16 Montana Grizzlies basketball team

References

Montana Lady Griz basketball seasons
Idaho
Lady
Lady